La La Lucille is a musical with a book by Fred Jackson, primary lyrics by Arthur J. Jackson and Buddy DeSylva, additional lyrics by Lou Paley and Irving Caesar, and music by George Gershwin.

Plot overview
The plot involves a wealthy society matron who leaves her considerable fortune to her nephew on condition he divorce his chorus girl wife. In order to collect his legacy, he decides to comply with the terms and then remarry her after he receives the money. Since divorces are granted only for adultery, a Philadelphia hotel employee named Lucille Jaynes-Smith arranges for him to be found with a woman who is not his wife. He registers at the property as John Smith, and comic complications ensue when he discovers there are more than three dozen other John Smiths registered there as well.

Production

The musical opened on Broadway at Henry Miller's Theatre on May 26, 1919, but had to suspend performances when Actors' Equity went on strike on August 19. After the dispute was settled, it reopened at the Criterion Theatre on September 8 and remained there until October 11, 1919 closing after 104 performances. The director was Herbert Gresham, with choreography by Julian Alfred. The cast included Maurice Cass, Eleanor Daniels, John Hazzard, Janet Velie, Lorin Raker, Marjorie Bentley, Helen Clarke, Alfred Hall, J. Clarence Harvey, and Cordelia MacDonald.

This was the "first complete book musical score" that Gershwin wrote. The production toured — with original cast members for some time — in 1920–21, all the way to the west coast, and in Canada as well. Among several later "stock" performances outside of New York was a Massachusetts staging in 1926.

In 2019, the Third Avenue Playhouse in Sturgeon Bay, Wisconsin adapted and reproduced the musical. The Playhouse's co-artistic director, James Valcq, spent years researching and reassembling the original songs and book in order to recreate the original musical as faithfully as possible.

Song list
Act I
Kindly Pay Us
When You Live in a Furnished Flat
The Best of Everything
From Now On
Money, Money, Money
Tee-Oodle-Um-Bum-Bo
Act II
Hotel Life
(Oo, How) I Love to Be Loved by You
It's Great To Be in Love
Act 3
Kisses (There's More to a Kiss than the Sound)
It Seldom Comes True
Tee-Oodle-Um-Bum-Bo (Reprise)
The Ten Commandments of Love
Nobody But You

References

External links

1919 musicals
Broadway musicals
Musicals by George Gershwin